Zeng Wanzhong (1894 – 1968) was a KMT general from Yunnan. He was made a lieutenant general in April 1935. He commanded the 5th Army Group from February 1939 to March 1942. He fought against the Imperial Japanese Army in Shanxi.

External links

National Revolutionary Army generals from Yunnan
1894 births
1968 deaths